The 1st Division (1. Division) is the second-highest football league in Denmark, also known as NordicBet Liga for sponsorship reasons. From 1945 to 1991 the 1. Division was the name of the highest level of football in Denmark. With the formation of the Danish Superliga, the 1st Division became the second tier of Danish football. While all the teams in the Superliga are full-time professional the 1. Division has a mixture of full-time professional and semi-professional teams.

The top-ranking teams each year win promotion to the Superliga, while the bottom finishers get relegated to the Danish 2nd Division.

Viaplay broadcasts all matches from the league.

History

After World War II the format of the top-flight football division in Denmark, the "Championship League", where reverted with the tournament now named the "1st Division". There were 10 teams in the top division once again, playing each other twice, with the lowest team being relegated. The 1953–54 season saw the first non-Copenhagen team win the Danish championship, when Køge Boldklub won the title. The championship title was not reclaimed by a Copenhagen team in more than ten years, until Akademisk Boldklub (AB) won the 1967 season.

From 1958, the Danish championship was arranged through one calendar year, and the 1956–57 season lasted 18 months with the teams playing each other thrice for a 27 games total. From 1958 to 1974, the tournament was expanded to 12 teams, playing each other twice for 22 games per season each, but now the bottom two teams faced relegation. The number of teams was increased to 16 for the 1975 season, which resulted in 30 games per season. In 1986, the number of participants was altered once more, this time decreasing the number of teams to 14, and the number of games to 26.

In 1991, the Danish Superliga was created. This meant the 1st Division became the second-highest league. Together with the Superliga introduction the best Danish leagues changed back to autumn-spring seasons.

In 1996, the 1st Division had its first name sponsor, as the league received the official name "Faxe Kondi Divisionen" after main sponsor Faxe Brewery. The sponsor deal ended in 2001, but from 2004 to mid-2007 it was named "Viasat Sport Divisionen". The "Sport" was omitted upon the closing of the Viasat Sport-channels in Denmark, and the opening of TV 2 Sport. The sponsorship finally ended prior to the start of the 2010–11 season.

Former 1st Division sponsors and logos:

Current teams (2022–23)

Previous winners 
First tier until 1990, then second tier

Footnotes

External links
 

 
2
Denmark
Professional sports leagues in Denmark